In baseball statistics, an error is an act, in the judgment of the official scorer, of a fielder misplaying a ball in a manner that allows a batter or baserunner to advance one or more bases or allows an at bat to continue after the batter should have been put out. The right fielder (RF) is one of the three outfielders, the defensive positions in baseball farthest from the batter. Right field is the area of the outfield to the right of a person standing at home plate and facing toward the pitcher's mound. The outfielders must try to catch long fly balls before they hit the ground, or to quickly catch or retrieve and return to the infield any other balls entering the outfield. The right fielder must also be adept at navigating the area of right field where the foul line approaches the corner of the playing field and the walls of the seating areas. Being the outfielder farthest from third base, the right fielder often has to make longer throws than the other outfielders to throw out runners advancing around the bases, so they often have the strongest or most accurate throwing arm. The right fielder normally plays behind the second baseman and first baseman, who play in or near the infield; unlike catchers and most infielders (excepting first basemen), who are virtually exclusively right-handed, right fielders can be either right- or left-handed. In the scoring system used to record defensive plays, the right fielder is assigned the number 9, the highest number.

The list of career leaders is dominated by players from the early 20th century; only six of the top 20 players were active after 1951, only one of whom played primarily in the American League. Only nine of the top 91 single-season totals were recorded after 1939, only four after 1979. To a large extent, the leaders reflect longevity rather than lower skill. Roberto Clemente, who tied a modern National League record with 131 errors as a right fielder, won twelve consecutive Gold Glove Awards for defensive excellence.

Because game accounts and box scores often did not distinguish between the outfield positions, there has been some difficulty in determining precise defensive statistics prior to 1901; because of this, and because of the similarity in their roles, defensive statistics for the three positions are frequently combined. Although efforts to distinguish between the three positions regarding games played during this period and reconstruct the separate totals have been largely successful, separate error totals are unavailable; players whose totals are missing the figures for pre-1901 games are notated in the table below. Harry Hooper is the modern (post-1900) leader in career errors committed by a right fielder with 144. Dave Parker is second all-time, and holds the modern National League record with 134 career errors in right field. Only fourteen right fielders have committed more than 100 career errors at the position since 1900.

Key

List

 Stats updated through the 2022 season

Other Hall of Famers

Notes

References

Baseball-Reference.com

Major League Baseball statistics
Major League Baseball lists